Caravelle may be a reference to:

 Caravelle, the French marketing name for the typeface Folio
 The Caravelle peninsula of the French Caribbean island of Martinique
 Sud Aviation Caravelle, the short/medium-range jet airliner, produced by Sud Aviation
 Sud Aviation Super-Caravelle, the design for a supersonic transport from Sud Aviation
 Volkswagen Caravelle (disambiguation), minibuses/vans produced by Volkswagen
 Renault Caravelle, the roadster automobile produced by Renault
 Plymouth Caravelle, a sedan made by Chrysler Corporation from 1983 to 1988
 Plymouth Caravelle Salon, a rebadged Dodge Diplomat sold in Canada
 An alternative spelling of caravel, a 15th-century sailing ship
 , a Danish cargo ship in service 1938-40
 Caravelle Hotel, Ho Chih Minh City
 Caravelle Manifesto, 1960 Vietnamese political document presented in that hotel
 The Caravelles, British duo girl band
 La Caravelle, restaurant and jazz venue in Marseille, France
 La Caravelle (New York), restaurant in New York City, specialising in French cuisine

See also
 Caravello, a surname